Maud Green, Lady Parr (6 April 1492 – 1 December 1531) was an English courtier. She was the mother of Catherine Parr, the sixth wife of King Henry VIII of England. She was a close friend and lady-in-waiting to Catherine of Aragon. She was also co-heiress to her father, Sir Thomas Green of Green's Norton in Northamptonshire along with her sister, Anne, Lady Vaux.

Life 
Maud was born on 6 April 1492 in Northamptonshire, the daughter of Sir Thomas Green, of Boughton and Green's Norton, and Jane Fogge, daughter of Sir John Fogge.

Her mother died when she was an infant. She became a lady-in-waiting to Catherine of Aragon, the first wife of King Henry VIII sometime after 11 June 1509. She was in constant attendance upon the Queen and was allocated her own rooms at Court on a permanent basis. It is thought that Maud may have named her daughter Catherine after Catherine of Aragon, who was also made godmother to the child.

Education
Maud was a very intelligent and well-educated woman; she was also fluent in French and was lauded as an excellent teacher by her peers.

Marriage 
Maud had married Sir Thomas Parr, the eldest son of Sir William Parr and Elizabeth FitzHugh, in 1508 when she was about 16 years old. He was the Sheriff of Northamptonshire, master of the wards and comptroller to the King. Maud and Thomas had three surviving children. Although Thomas Parr inherited properties in the north including Kendal Castle in Westmorland, the Parr's resided at Parr House which was located on The Strand in London. By the time Sir Thomas had inherited the castle, it was in need of repair and eventually became derelict. Parr and his wife were courtiers and stayed close to court. Thomas Parr died of the sweating sickness on 11 November 1517, leaving Maud a widow at the age of 25. She chose not to remarry for fear of jeopardizing the huge inheritance she held in trust for her children. She carefully supervised the education of her children and studiously arranged their marriages.

Issue 
Before the birth of Catherine, Maud gave birth to a son shortly after her marriage to Sir Thomas. The happiness was short lived as the baby quickly died and his name was never known. After the birth of their third child, Anne, Maud again became pregnant c. 1517, the same year of Thomas' death. However, there is no subsequent mention of the child, so it was probably lost through a miscarriage, stillbirth, or death in early infancy.

Surviving children of Maud Green:
 Catherine Parr (1512 – 5 September 1548) who married four times:
Sir Edward Burgh, 1529 at Gainsborough, Lincolnshire, England.
John Neville, 3rd Baron Latimer, summer 1534 in London, Middlesex, England.
King Henry VIII, 12 July 1543 at Hampton Court Palace in the Queen's Privy closet.
Thomas Seymour, 1st Baron Seymour of Sudeley, late Spring 1547 and had one daughter: Lady Mary.
 William Parr, 1st Marquess of Northampton, 1st Earl of Essex (1513 – 28 October 1571), married three times, but produced no issue:
Anne Bourchier, 7th Baroness Bourchier in 1527.
Elisabeth Brooke
Helena Snakenborg
 Anne Parr, Countess of Pembroke (15 June 1515 – 20 February 1552), married in 1538, William Herbert, 1st Earl of Pembroke, by whom she had two sons and a daughter: Henry Herbert, 2nd Earl of Pembroke (c. 1539-1601), Sir Edward Herbert (1547–1595), and Lady Anne Herbert (1550–1592).

Ancestry

Death 
Maud died on 1 December 1531 and is buried in St. Ann's Church, Blackfriars Church, London, England beside her husband. In her will, she left her daughter Catherine a jeweled cipher pendant in the shape of an 'M'.

Notes 
 Mike Ashley "British Kings and Queens", New York; Carroll and Graf Publishing Inc., 1998.
 Anthony Martienssen "Queen Katherine Parr", McGraw-Hill Book Company, 1973. pg 7, 17, 18, 29-39.

References

1492 births
1531 deaths
English ladies-in-waiting
15th-century English people
People from Northamptonshire
15th-century English women
16th-century English women
Parr family
16th-century educators
Household of Catherine of Aragon
Wives of knights